Khunwa  is a village in Shohratgarh tehsil of Siddharthnagar district in the Indian state of Uttar Pradesh.  It is located on the border with Nepal, across from the town Taulihawa.  Movement of Nepalese and Indian nationals across the border is unrestricted, however there is a customs checkpoint for goods.

References

Villages in Siddharthnagar district
Transit and customs posts along the India–Nepal border